Berlandiera pumila, the soft greeneyes, is a North American species of flowering plant in the family Asteraceae. It is native to the southeastern and south-central United States (Texas, Oklahoma, Arkansas, Louisiana, Alabama, Georgia, Florida, South Carolina, and North Carolina).

Berlandiera pumila is a branching herb up to 100 cm (40 inches) tall. It has several flower heads with yellow ray florets and maroon disc florets. It grows in open locations such as fields, roadsides, woodlands, etc.

References

External links 

pumila
Flora of the Southern United States
Plants described in 1803